Tigran Melikov's House is a historic mansion located at the crossing of Islam Safarli and Hazi Aslanov streets in Baku, Azerbaijan. The mansion was built between 1895 and 1897 on the order of Tigran Melikov, a son of the Armenian industrialist Ambarsum Melikov. It is the first building built in the Gothic style in Baku, as well as Józef Gosławski's first project on personal order.

History
In 1813, while establishing the outer-city, the area was given the architectural look of a square, which is still preserved. The mansion was built at crossing of Islam Safarli and Hazi Aslanov streets. Melikov's mansion was the first building to be built in gothic style in Baku. While building the mansion, Adolf Eichler was preparing plan of a gothic styled church in 28 May Street.

Architectural features
In terms of the difficulty of the residential building, the individual form of the project is formed in the context of the classical style of Baku. The facades are covered with stones. The mansion is full of windows which helps to enlighten it. The rooms in the south and east and the staircase are brightly lit by the lamp on the roof. 

Profiled arches were used on the two upper floors of the building. On the third floor a balcony is opened on bay window fixed on second floor. Bay windows contains two main and two additional windows. The narrowest part of the residential property is located in the east. Shamil Fatullayev notes, Gosławski created facades under influence of Florencian palaces.

Gallery

References

Tourist attractions in Baku
Architecture in Azerbaijan
Culture in Baku
 Buildings and structures completed in 1897
Gothic Revival architecture in Azerbaijan
Józef Gosławski buildings and structures